Maliget (also Romanized as Malīget; also known as Malikat and Melīgeyt) is a village in Mosharrahat Rural District, in the Central District of Ahvaz County, Khuzestan Province, Iran. At the 2006 census, its population was 432, in 81 families.

References 

Populated places in Ahvaz County